Saint Modesta (died c. 680) was the founder and Abbess of the monastery of Oeren in Trier, Germany.

Biography
Modesta was the niece of Itta of Metz and a cousin of St. Gertrude (626–659). Modesta became a Benedictine nun and was appointed the first abbess, by Saint Modoald, her uncle, for the convent of Oeren, Trier, Germany.

The abbey was built on the Roman horrea, the ancient granaries still remaining on the site and the name is also given as Öhren or Ohren, Øhren, Oehren, Oeren, Herren or Horreum. It was later renamed after Irmina of Oeren, the abbey's second abbess.

Family

References

7th-century Germanic people
Medieval German saints
7th-century Frankish women
German Roman Catholic abbesses